Mesoflavibacter zeaxanthinifaciens is a Gram-negative, strictly aerobic, rod-shaped, halophilic and mesophilic bacterium from the genus of Mesoflavibacter. Mesoflavibacter zeaxanthinifaciens produces zeaxanthin.

References

Flavobacteria
Bacteria described in 2008